New York State Route 368 (NY 368) was a state highway in Onondaga County, New York, in the United States. It was one of the shortest routes in the county, extending for only  between NY 321 and NY 5 in the town of Elbridge. NY 368 was known as Halfway Road for the hamlet it served near its midpoint. The route was assigned in the 1930s and removed in 1980 as part of a highway maintenance swap between the state of New York and Onondaga County.

Route description

NY 368 began at an intersection with NY 321 adjacent to the Carpenter's Brook Fish Hatchery in the town of Elbridge. The route headed north as Halfway Road, passing by farmland as it headed through a rural area of Onondaga County to the small hamlet of Halfway. Here, NY 368 served a small number of homes as it crossed a Conrail railroad line (now part of the Finger Lakes Railway) at the center of the community. Outside of Halfway, the route turned to the northwest toward the village of Elbridge, avoiding a marshy area directly north of Halfway. It intersected with Lynch Road and Campbell Road before turning slightly northward and following Carpenter's Brook through another undeveloped area to an intersection with NY 5 east of the village, where NY 368 ended.

History
NY 368 was assigned in the 1930s as a connector between NY 321 and NY 5 in the town of Elbridge by way of the hamlet of Halfway. It remained unchanged until April 1, 1980, when ownership and maintenance of the route was transferred from the state of New York to Onondaga County as part of a highway maintenance swap between the two levels of government. The county also assumed ownership and maintenance of the Onondaga County portion of NY 31B as part of the exchange. NY 368 was redesignated as County Route 107 (CR 107) following the swap.

Major intersections

See also

List of county routes in Onondaga County, New York

References

External links

368
Transportation in Onondaga County, New York